Human behavioral ecology (HBE) or human evolutionary ecology applies the principles of evolutionary theory and optimization to the study of human behavioral and cultural diversity. HBE examines the adaptive design of traits, behaviors, and life histories of humans in an ecological context. One aim of modern human behavioral ecology is to determine how ecological and social factors influence and shape behavioral flexibility within and between human populations. Among other things, HBE attempts to explain variation in human behavior as adaptive solutions to the competing life-history demands of growth, development, reproduction, parental care, and mate acquisition.

HBE overlaps with evolutionary psychology, human or cultural ecology, and decision theory. It is most prominent in disciplines such as anthropology and psychology where human evolution is considered relevant for a holistic understanding of human behavior or in economics where self-interest, methodological individualism, and maximization are key elements in modeling behavioral responses to various ecological factors.

Evolutionary theory

Human behavioral ecology rests upon a foundation of evolutionary theory. This includes aspects of both general evolutionary theory and established middle-level evolutionary theories, as well. Aspects of general evolutionary theory include:
Natural selection, the process by which individual organisms with favorable traits are more likely to survive and reproduce.
Sexual selection, the theory that competition for mates between individuals of the same sex results in differential mating and reproduction.
Kin selection, the changes in gene frequency across generations that are driven at least in part by interactions between related individuals.
Inclusive fitness, the sum of an individual's own reproductive success, (natural and sexual selection), plus the effects the individual's actions have on the reproductive success of that individual's kin, (kin selection).

Middle-level evolutionary theories used in HBE include:
The theory of parental investment, which predicts that the sex making the largest investment in lactation, nurturing and protecting offspring will be more discriminating in mating and that the sex that invests less in offspring will compete for access to the higher investing sex.
Parent–offspring conflict, which predicts that because the genetic interests of parents and offspring are not identical, offspring will be selected to manipulate their parents in order to ensure higher investment, and that, conversely, parents will be selected to manipulate their offspring.
The theory of reciprocal altruism, a form of altruism in which one organism provides a benefit to another in the expectation of future reciprocation.
The Trivers–Willard hypothesis, which proposes that parents should invest more in the sex that gives them the greatest reproductive payoff (grandchildren) with increasing or marginal investment.
r/K selection theory, which, in ecology, relates to the selection of traits in organisms that allow success in particular environments. r-selected species – in unstable or unpredictable environments – produce many offspring, any individual one of which is unlikely to survive to adulthood, while K-selected species – in stable or predictable environments – invest more heavily in fewer offspring, each of which has a better chance of surviving to adulthood.
Evolutionary game theory, the application of population genetics-inspired models of change in gene frequency in populations to game theory.
Evolutionarily stable strategy, which refers to a strategy, which if adopted by a population, cannot be invaded by any competing alternative strategy.

Basic principles

Ecological selectionism

Ecological selectionism refers to the assumption that humans are highly flexible in their behaviors. Furthermore, it assumes that various ecological forces select for various behaviors that optimize humans' inclusive fitness in their given ecological context.

The piecemeal approach

The piecemeal approach refers to taking a reductionist approach as opposed to a holistic approach in studying human socioecological behavior. Human behavioral ecologists assume that by taking complex social phenomena, (e.g., marriage patterns, foraging behaviors, etc.), and then breaking them down into sets of components involving decisions and constraints that they are in a better position to create models and make predictions involving human behavior. An example would be examining marriage systems by examining the ecological context, mate preferences, the distribution of particular characteristics within the population, and so forth.

Conditional strategies

Human behavioral ecologists assume that what might be the most adaptive strategy in one environment might not be the most adaptive strategy in another environment. Conditional strategies, therefore, can be represented in the following statement:
In environmental context X, engage in adaptive strategy A.
In environmental context Y, engage in adaptive strategy B.

The phenotypic gambit

The phenotypic gambit refers to the simplifying assumption that complex traits, such as behavioural traits, can be modelled as if they were controlled by single distinct alleles, representing alternate strategies. In other words, the phenotypic gambit assumes that "selection will favour traits with high fitness ...irrespective of the particulars of inheritance."

Modeling
Theoretical models that human behavioral ecologists employ include, but are not limited to:

Optimal foraging theory, which states that organisms focus on consuming the most energy while expending the least amount of energy.
Life history theory, which postulates that many of the physiological traits and behaviors of individuals may be best understood in relation to the key maturational and reproductive characteristics that define the life course.
Sex allocation theory, which predicts that parents should bias their reproductive investments toward the offspring sex generating the greatest fitness return.
The polygyny threshold model, which suggests that polygyny is driven by female choice of mates who control more resources relative to other potential mates in the population.

See also
 Behavioral ecology
 Biocultural evolution
 Dual inheritance theory
 Evolutionary developmental psychology
 Evolutionary educational psychology
 Foraging, Autonomous foraging
 Hypergamy
 Human reproductive ecology
 Mating system
 Psychogenomics

References

Further reading
 Borgerhoff Mulder, M. & Schacht, R. (2012). Human Behavioural Ecology. Nature Encyclopedia of Life Sciences.
 Hames, R. (2001). Human Behavioral Ecology. International Encyclopedia of the Social & Behavioral Sciences. Elsevier Science Ltd.
 Cronk, L. (1991). Human behavioral ecology. Annual Review of Anthropology, 20, 25-53.
 Smith, Eric Alden (1999). Three Styles in the Evolutionary Analysis of Human Behavior in Lee Cronk, Napoleon Chagnon and William Irons Adaptation and Human Behavior: An Anthropological Perspective, 27-48, New York: Aldine de Gruyter.
 Winterhalder, Bruce & Smith, Eric Alden (2000). Analysing Adaptive Strategies: Human Behavioral Ecology at Twenty-Five. Evolutionary Anthropology: Issues, News, and Reviews, Volume 9, Issue 2.

External links
 The Human Behavioral Ecology Bibliography – Maintained by Kermyt G. Anderson

Demography
Anthropology
Behavioral ecology
Behavioural sciences
H
Sociobiology